The northern fin whale (Balaenoptera physalus physalus) is a subspecies of fin whale that lives in the North Atlantic Ocean and North Pacific Ocean. It has been proposed that the northern Pacific population represents a separate subspecies, B. p. velifera. At least one other subspecies of fin whale, the southern fin whale (B. p. quoyi), exists in the southern hemisphere.

Size

Northern fin whales are smaller than their southern hemisphere counterparts, with adult males averaging  and adult females .

Reproduction

Because of the opposing seasons in each hemisphere, B. p. physalus breeds at a different time of the year than B. p. quoyi. Peak conception for B. p. physalus is December–January, while peak birthing is in November–December — in both the North Atlantic and North Pacific.

See also

References

Baleen whales
Mammals described in 1758
Taxa named by Carl Linnaeus